Spelaeoniscidae is a family of crustaceans belonging to the order Isopoda.

Genera

Genera:
 Albertosphoera Caruso & Lombardo, 1983
 Atlantoniscus Vandel, 1959
 Barbarosphaera Vandel, 1948

References

Isopoda